Kraikiat Beadtaku (born January 26, 1982) is a Thai retired professional footballer who played as a centre back.

International career

Kraikiat played for the Thailand national football team in the 1999 FIFA U-17 World Championship and also played for the senior side in the 2006 FIFA World Cup qualifying rounds.

Honours

Club
Buriram PEA
 Thai Premier League: 2011
 Thai FA Cup: 2011
 Thai League Cup: 2011

Nakhon Ratchasima
 Thai Division 1 League: 2014

International 
Thailand U-23
 Sea Games Gold Medal: 2005

References

External links
 Profile at Goal
 

1982 births
Living people
Kraikiat Beadtaku
Kraikiat Beadtaku
Association football defenders
Kraikiat Beadtaku
Kraikiat Beadtaku
Kraikiat Beadtaku
Kraikiat Beadtaku
Kraikiat Beadtaku
Kraikiat Beadtaku
Kraikiat Beadtaku
Kraikiat Beadtaku
Kraikiat Beadtaku
Kraikiat Beadtaku
Kraikiat Beadtaku
Footballers at the 2002 Asian Games
Kraikiat Beadtaku
Southeast Asian Games medalists in football
Competitors at the 2005 Southeast Asian Games
Kraikiat Beadtaku